Harrison Lake State Park is a  public recreation area located  southwest of Fayette, Ohio, in the United States. The park surrounds  Harrison Lake, which has a maximum depth of fifteen feet near the dam and provides a habitat for bluegill, channel catfish, largemouth bass, white crappie, and bullhead. The state park includes a  hiking trail around the lake, swimming beach, and camping area.

History
Harrison Lake was created with the damming of Mill Creek, a tributary of the Tiffin River, in 1939. The property was turned over to the Ohio Department of Natural Resources for development of a state park in 1950.

References

External links 
Harrison Lake State Park Ohio Department of Natural Resources
Harrison Lake State Park Map Ohio Department of Natural Resources 

State parks of Ohio
Protected areas of Fulton County, Ohio
Protected areas established in 1950
1950 establishments in Ohio
Tourist attractions in Fulton County, Ohio